Corachol (alternatively Coracholan, Cora-Huichol or Coran) is a grouping of languages within the Uto-Aztecan language family. The living members of Coracholan are the Huichol and Cora languages, spoken by communities in Jalisco and Nayarit, states in central Mexico. Cazcan (Chichimeca) may have belonged as well.

Corachol languages are Mesoamerican languages, and display many of the traits defined by the Mesoamerican linguistic area, or sprachbund.

References

Southern Uto-Aztecan languages
Mesoamerican languages